The Nameless Coffeehouse, in Cambridge, Massachusetts, opened in 1967 and is now New England's oldest all-volunteer coffeehouse. Located in the First Parish Unitarian Universalist Church in Harvard Square, the Nameless currently presents a six-concert schedule showcasing acoustic music and comedy for a moderate suggested donation ($8–$15 for the 2011 season). 

From its birth during the folk revival in the 1960s, The Nameless has been influential in the local folk music scene, nurturing performers in the early stages of their careers, encouraging them to hone their craft, and providing a receptive audience. The Nameless continues to highlight performances by local original singer-songwriters. Performers who have played the Nameless include Mary Chapin Carpenter, Tracy Chapman, Patty Larkin, The Story (Jonatha Brooke and Jennifer Kimball), Ellis Paul, Dar Williams, John Gorka, Bob Franke, Ric Ocasek, James "Hutch" Hutchinson, Geoff Bartley, and Greg Greenway, as well as comedians Andy Kaufman and Jay Leno. Fred Small, as of 2009 the minister of the First Parish, also has performed at the Coffeehouse. 

When it first opened, the Nameless was managed by Harvard students, who were joined, by the early 1970s, by students from MIT and later Tufts University as well. Through 1982, the Coffeehouse was open Friday and Saturday evenings during the school year, and both music and refreshments were provided free of charge, although donations were encouraged and accepted. 

The Nameless has weathered many changes over the years, and confronted many challenges to stay open and viable. Its minimal costs are now met by door proceeds and donated goods and services. The present volunteer crew are veteran volunteers and supporters of the local music scene. Sound man Doug Scott has been running sound since the 1980s.

The Coffeehouse still offers a limited number of free admissions to concerts for volunteers, arranged in advance through the volunteer coordinator. Information on volunteer opportunities is available at The Nameless website.

References

Folk music venues
Buildings and structures in Cambridge, Massachusetts
Harvard Square
Music venues in Massachusetts
Tourist attractions in Cambridge, Massachusetts
Nightclubs in Massachusetts